The Canton of Châtenois is a French former administrative grouping of communes in the Vosges département of eastern France and in the region of Lorraine. It was disbanded following the French canton reorganisation which came into effect in March 2015. It had 6,828 inhabitants (2012).

It had its administrative centre at Châtenois.

Composition
The Canton of Châtenois comprised the following 25 communes:

Aouze
Aroffe
Balléville
Châtenois
Courcelles-sous-Châtenois
Darney-aux-Chênes
Dolaincourt
Dommartin-sur-Vraine
Gironcourt-sur-Vraine
Houécourt
La Neuveville-sous-Châtenois
Longchamp-sous-Châtenois
Maconcourt
Morelmaison
Ollainville
Pleuvezain
Rainville
Removille
Rouvres-la-Chétive
Saint-Paul
Sandaucourt
Soncourt
Vicherey
Viocourt
Vouxey

References

Chatenois
2015 disestablishments in France
States and territories disestablished in 2015